The Fiddle Range is a mountain range of the Canadian Rockies located south of Highway 16 on the east border of Jasper National Park, Canada.

The range was so named on account of noises produced by blowing wind.

This range includes the following mountains and peaks:

References

Mountain ranges of Alberta
Ranges of the Canadian Rockies